Sinatra's Swingin' Session!!! is a 1961 album by Frank Sinatra.

Six of the tracks on the album are re-recordings of a batch of songs that Sinatra had previously recorded on the Columbia album, Sing and Dance with Frank Sinatra.

It was released on compact disc as Sinatra's Swingin' Session!!! And More.

Track listing

Personnel
 Frank Sinatra – vocals
 Nelson Riddle – arranger, conductor
 Buddy Collette – tenor sax, flutes

References

1961 albums
Albums arranged by Nelson Riddle
Albums conducted by Nelson Riddle
Albums produced by Dave Cavanaugh
Capitol Records albums
Frank Sinatra albums
Albums recorded at Capitol Studios